Catocala electilis is a moth of the family Erebidae. It is found in Arizona and Mexico.

The larvae feed on Populus fremontii.

References

External links
Species info

electilis
Moths described in 1858
Moths of North America